A list of films produced by the Marathi language film industry, based in the Indian state of Maharashtra in the year 1998.

1998 Releases
The following is a list of Marathi films released in 1998.

References

Lists of 1998 films by country or language
 Marathi
1998